Nawa-I-Barakzayi is a village and the district center of Nawa-I-Barakzayi District, Helmand Province, Afghanistan near the Helmand River.

See also
 Nawa-I-Barakzayi District
 Helmand Province
 Helmand River

References 

Populated places in Helmand Province